Limburg-Hohenlimburg was a county in Germany in the Middle Ages. It was created as a partition of Limburg-Isenberg by Diederck I of Isenberg, who called himself in 1246 Diederick I van Limburg. Of Diederick's two sons, the eldest son Johan who died in 1277 at the adge of thirty and left two sons and one daughter. He is the ancestor of the lordship Styrum. His youger brother Everhard continued 30 years more, the struggle with his father for the conquest of former Isenberger family property. Everhard, in 1301 the 'nearest in the bloodline', succeeded his father.

Two houses of Limburg 
The house of Limburg since then was divided in the house Counts of Limburg-Hohenlimburg, later on the house of Limburg Hohenlimburg and Lordship of Broich and the house of Limburg-Styrum, which still exists today. Limburg-Hohenlimburg passed to the Daun-Falkenstein in 1511, then Neuenahr-Alpen in 1542. Limburg-Hohenlimburg became a possession of the counts of Bentheim at the end of the 16th century, who kept it until it was mediatized to the Grand Duchy of Berg in 1808. The count of Bentheim still owns the fortress of Hohenlimburg.

Counts of Limburg
 John I (1247–1277) Ancestor of the Lordschip Limburg-Styrum
 Eberhard I (1253-1308) Ancestor of the Counts of Limburg Hohenlimburg and Broich

Literature
 Kraus, Thomas R., Die Entstehung der Landesherrschaft der Grafen von Berg bis zum Jahre 1225, Neustadt an der Aisch 1981 
 Andernach, Norbert, Entwicklung der Grafschaft Berg. Land im Mittelpunkt der Mächte. Die Herzogtümer Jülich-Kleve-Berg, Kleve 1984, S. 63–73. 
 Hoederath, H.T. Der Fall des Hauses Isenberg 1225/1226. Rechtsgeschichterlicher und soziologischer Schau, 1954 Zeitschrift der Savigny stiftung fur Rechtsgeschichte. Kanonistische Abteilung 
 Aders,G. Die Grafen (von Limburg) und die Herrn von Limburg-Styrum aus dem Haus Berg-Altena-Isenberg. Zeitschift 'Der Marker" 1956 blad 7. 
 Korteweg, K.N. Decendants of Dietrich I Graf von Limburg Hohenlimburg. (Corrected lineage). De Nederlandse Leeuw Jaargang LXXXI no.8 August 1964.
 Berg, A. Lineage counts of Limburg Hohenlimburg and Lords of Limburg-Styrum. (Same independent conclusion) Archive fur Sippenforschung Heft 14. Jahrgang 30. Mai 1964.
 Bleicher, W. Hohenlimburgher Heimatblätter'' fűr den Raum Hagen und Isenlohn. Beiträge zur Landeskunde. Monatsschrift des Vereins fűr Orts- und Heimatkunde Hohenlimburg e.V. Drűck Geldsetzer und Schäfer Gmbh. Iserlohn. County of Limburg Lenne. Historian and Editor: Publications in Hohenlimburger Heimatblätter 1976 bis zu 2012

References

Sources 
 Aders,G. 1956. [German] Die Grafen (von Limburg) und die Herrn von Limburg-Styrum aus dem Haus Berg-Altena-Isenberg. Zeitschift Der Marker 1956 blad 7.
 Berg,A. 1964. [German] Archive fur Sippenforschung Heft 14. Jahrgang 30. Mai 1964
 Bleicher, W. / Van Limburg H, 1998-2004  [German / Dutch] Neue Aspekte der Geschichte der Grafen von Hohen-Limburg und ihrer Nachkommen. In: Hohenlimburger Heimatblätter, Teil 1: 59, 1998, S. 81–93; Teil 2: 59, 1998, S. 201–213; Teil 3: 59, 1998, S. 281–294, 307–311; Teil 4: 63, 2002, S. 364–375, 386–390; Teil 5: 64, 2003, S. 210–214, 226–230 & Hefte (2004) S. 70–79.
 Korteweg, K.N. 1964.[Dutch] De Nederlandse Leeuw Jaargang LXXXI no.8 August 1964.
 Rudiger, R. / Barth, E.:1990 [German]  Der Herzog in Lotharingien im 10. Jahrhundert. Jan Thorbecke Verlag Sigmaringen 
 Van Limburg, H. 2016 [Dutch]. Graven van Limburg Hohenlimburg & Broich. 

Counties of the Holy Roman Empire
States and territories established in 1246

Counts of Limburg

1304 disestablishments